Asby may refer to:

Places
England
Asby, Copeland, a village in the Borough of Copeland, Cumbria
Asby, Eden, a civil parish in the district of Eden, Cumbria
Great Asby, a village in the district of Eden, Cumbria
Little Asby, a village in the district of Eden, Cumbria

Sweden
Asby, Sweden, a town